Lukavec is a municipality and village in Litoměřice District in the Ústí nad Labem Region of the Czech Republic. It has about 400 inhabitants.

References

Villages in Litoměřice District